The 1956 North Carolina lieutenant gubernatorial election was held on November 8, 1956. Democratic nominee Luther E. Barnhardt defeated Republican nominee Joseph A. Dunn with 66.71% of the vote.

Primary elections
Primary elections were held on May 26, 1956.

Democratic primary

Candidates
Luther E. Barnhardt, State Senator
Alonzo C. Edwards, State Representative
Kidd Brewer
Gurney P. Hood, former North Carolina Commissioner of Banks
James V. Whitfield, State Senator

Results

General election

Candidates
Luther E. Barnhardt, Democratic
Joseph A. Dunn, Republican

Results

References

1956
Gubernatorial
North Carolina